Octapolis or Oktapolis was a town of ancient Caria or Lycia, noted by Ptolemy.

Its site is located near Kızılkaya, Asiatic Turkey.

References

Populated places in ancient Caria
Populated places in ancient Lycia
Former populated places in Turkey